Niya, is a town  in  Minfeng County, Hotan Prefecture, Xinjiang Uygur Autonomous Region, China.

It is the county seat of  Minfeng County, and therefore is commonly referred to as Minfeng, and is labeled so on less detailed maps.  An ancient town also called Niya is located 115 km to the north of this modern Niya.

History
Niya/Minfeng was known in ancient time as Ronglu during the Han dynasties (206 BC - 222 AD) and, according to the Hanshu Chapter 96A, was said to have had "240 households, 610 individuals with 300 persons able to bear arms" during the Former Han Dynasty (206 BC - 23 AD). It is situated about 115 km north of the modern town of Minfeng. Numerous Buddhist scriptures, sculptures, mummies and other precious archeological finds have been made in the region. The remains of more than seventy buildings have been discovered scattered over an area of some 45 km2. It was located on the southern branch of the Silk Road.

In the early 20th century, Aurel Stein carried out several expeditions in the area including exploration of the ancient Niya ruins.

In 2015, Lanpalu was added as a residential community.

In 2017, Ankang, Xingfu, Tuanjie, Hexie, Guangming and Youyi were established as residential communities.

Geography

Niya is located on China National Highway 315, which is the main Ruoqiang-Hotan road along the southern edge of the Tarim Basin.

It is situated 120 km east of Keriya, and about 330 km west of Qiemo (Cherchen). Human habitation in the area is possible because of the Niya River, fed by the snows and glaciers of the Kunlun.

Niya is a small town of about 10,000 people with a small market, shops, many restaurants, and a hotel.

Administrative divisions
As of 2018, the county includes ten residential communities and two villages:

Residential communities (Mandarin Chinese Hanyu Pinyin-derived names):
 Bositanlu, Maidiniyetilu, Suodalu, Lanpalu, Ankang, Xingfu, Tuanjie, Hexie, Guangming, Youyi

Villages:
 Lanpa, Fufuke

In 2009, the county included:

Residential communities (Mandarin Chinese Hanyu Pinyin-derived names):
 Bositanlu, Maidiniyetilu, Suodalu

Villages:
 Lanpa, Fufuke

Demographics

The population of Niya Town proper declined between the 2000 and 2010 Census.

Transportation
 China National Highway 315

References

Further reading
 Bonavia, Judy 2004. The Silk Road From Xi’an to Kashgar. Revised by Christoph Baumer. 2004. Odyssey Publications. 
 Mallory, J. P. and Mair, Victor H. 2000. The Tarim Mummies: Ancient China and the Mystery of the Earliest Peoples from the West. Thames & Hudson. London. 2000.
 Stein, M. Aurel 1907. Ancient Khotan: Detailed report of archaeological explorations in Chinese Turkestan, 2 vols. Oxford. Clarendon Press.
 Stein, M. Aurel 1912. Ruins of Desert Cathay: Personal narrative of explorations in Central Asia and westernmost China, 2 vols. Reprint: Delhi. Low Price Publications. 1990.
 Stein, M. Aurel 1921. Serindia: Detailed report of explorations in Central Asia and westernmost China, 5 vols. London. Oxford. Clarendon Press. Reprint: Delhi. Motilal Banarsidass. 1980.
 Yu, Taishan. 2004. A History of the Relationships between the Western and Eastern Han, Wei, Jin, Northern and Southern Dynasties and the Western Regions. Sino-Platonic Papers No. 131 March, 2004. Dept. of East Asian Languages and Civilizations, University of Pennsylvania.

External links
 A brief description of the site of ancient Niya
 Archaeological GIS and Oasis Geography in the Tarim Basin
 News article on Niya finds

Oases of China
Hotan Prefecture
Populated places along the Silk Road
Populated places established in the 3rd century BC
Populated places in Xinjiang
3rd-century BC establishments in China
Township-level divisions of Xinjiang